Bad Religion is an American punk rock band.

Bad Religion may also refer to:

Bad Religion (EP), a 1981 extended play by the band
"Bad Religion" (song), a 2000 song by Godsmack
"Bad Religion," a song by Frank Ocean on the 2012 album Channel Orange

See also
Bad Religion discography